Jan Breydel Stadium is a multi-purpose stadium in Sint-Andries, Bruges, Belgium. The city-owned stadium is the home stadium of two top-flight association football clubs, Club Brugge and Cercle Brugge. It is used mainly for football matches, which cost between €5 and €60/seat/match. The stadium was built in 1975. It currently has 29,042 seats. It is named after Jan Breydel, an instigator of the Bruges Matins, the insurgency that led to the Battle of the Golden Spurs. Prior to 1999 and the Euro 2000 Championship the stadium was known as Olympiastadion , the Olympic stadium in Dutch, and had 18,000 seats. During December 2015 the pitch was resurfaced with an Italian proprietary hybrid grass (a mix of natural and artificial grass) called Mixto.

Average attendances
The average season attendances from league matches held at the Jan Breydel for Cercle Brugge and Club Brugge.

Euro 2000 Matches

References

External links
 www.clubbrugge.be
 www.cerclebrugge.be
 Jan Breydel: Photos stadium

Sports venues completed in 1975
Multi-purpose stadiums in Belgium
UEFA Euro 2000 stadiums in Belgium
Football venues in Flanders
Sports venues in West Flanders
Sport in Bruges
Buildings and structures in Bruges
Club Brugge KV
Cercle Brugge K.S.V.